The FTSE 250 Index ( "Footsie") is a capitalisation-weighted index consisting of the 101st to the 350th largest companies listed on the London Stock Exchange. Promotions and demotions to and from the index occur quarterly in March, June, September, and December. The Index is calculated in real-time and published every minute.

Related indices are the FTSE 100 Index (which lists the largest 100 companies), the FTSE 350 Index (which combines the FTSE 100 and 250), the FTSE SmallCap Index and the FTSE All-Share Index (an aggregation of the FTSE 100 Index, the FTSE 250 Index and the FTSE SmallCap Index).

Record values
The index began on 12 October 1992 at the base level of 831.38. The highest closing value of 24,353.85 was reached on 7 September 2021.

Annual returns
The following table lists the Total Return of the FTSE 250 index up to 31 December 2021.

Constituents 
The following table lists the FTSE 250 companies after the changes on 20 March 2023.

See also
FTSE 100
FTSE All-Share Index
 Fast Track 100 Sunday Times list of the 100 largest private (Non Listed) companies.
 Top Track 250 Sunday Times list of the 250 Mid-market (Non-Listed) companies.

References

External links
Official constituent list from FTSE Group 

Companies of the United Kingdom
 2
FTSE 250 Index
FTSE Group stock market indices
British stock market indices